Bellebat is a commune in the Gironde department in Nouvelle-Aquitaine in southwestern France.

Population

See also
Communes of the Gironde department

References

Communes of Gironde